Shin Se-Gye (born 16 September 1990) is a South Korean football football player, who plays for Suwon FC.

Club career
Shin, having spent his youth career at Sungkyunkwan University, entered the 2011 K-League draft intake, and was selected by Suwon Bluewings for the 2011 season.  His professional debut came in week five of the K-League, against Jeonbuk Hyundai Motors.  In a goalless draw, Shin finished the match with a yellow card. A little over a month later, in Suwon's final group game of the 2011 AFC Champions League, against Chinese Super League club Shanghai Shenhua F.C., Lee scored his first goal, helping Suwon to a 3–0 win.

References

External links

Living people
1990 births
Association football midfielders
South Korean footballers
Suwon Samsung Bluewings players
Gimcheon Sangmu FC players
Gangwon FC players
K League 1 players